Tmesisternus sulcatus is a species of longhorn beetles belonging to the family Cerambycidae, subfamily Lamiinae.

Distribution
This species can be found in Papua New Guinea (Cyclop Mountains).

References

sulcatus